The 1924 FA Cup final was contested by Newcastle United and Aston Villa at Wembley. Newcastle won 2–0, with the goals scored by Neil Harris and Stan Seymour. The match has become commonly known as the "Rainy Day Final" due to the weather that day, a consequence of which has led to there being very few good condition programmes left for the game (many fans used their match programmes as makeshift umbrellas). The value of the programme is the highest for any Wembley final with recent sales attaining over £6,000 at auction.

The referee was Swindon-born William E. Russell.

Road to the Final

Newcastle United

Aston Villa

Match details

External links

Match report at www.fa-cupfinals.co.uk
FA Cup Final lineups

FA Cup Finals
FA Cup Final
FA Cup Final 1924
FA Cup Final 1924
FA Cup Final
FA Cup Final
Events at Wembley Stadium